Cercospora puderii is a fungal plant pathogen.

References

External links

puderii
Fungal plant pathogens and diseases